Jerome M. Hughes (October 1, 1929 – June 26, 2015) was an American educator and politician.

Background
Hughes graduated from Cretin High School. He then received his bachelor's degree from University of St. Thomas, his master's degree from University of Minnesota, and his doctorate from Wayne State University. Hughes taught in high school and was a coach. He was a community educator administrator and public policy consultant with the St. Paul School District. He also taught at the University of Minnesota.

Political career
From Maplewood, Minnesota, Hughes was elected to the Senate in 1966, and served for 26 years in the body. He became chair of the education committee in 1973, and was elected President of the Senate in 1983, a position he would hold—save for during a special session in 1987—for the remainder of his time in office. Hughes was a Democrat. Hughes retired from the Senate in 1993.

References

Presidents of the Minnesota Senate
Democratic Party Minnesota state senators
1929 births
2015 deaths
Politicians from Saint Paul, Minnesota
University of St. Thomas (Minnesota) alumni
Wayne State University alumni
University of Minnesota alumni
University of Minnesota faculty